Rubidium-82 chloride is a form of rubidium chloride containing a radioactive isotope of rubidium.  It is marketed under the brand name Cardiogen-82 by Bracco Diagnostics for use in Myocardial perfusion imaging.  It is rapidly taken up by heart muscle cells, and therefore can be used to identify regions of heart muscle that are receiving poor blood flow in a technique called PET perfusion imaging. The half-life of the rubidium-82 is only 1.27 minutes; it is normally produced at the place of use  by rubidium generators.

References

Further reading
 (Note: only about 1/2 page on Rb-generator)

Rubidium compounds
Chlorides
Metal halides
Alkali metal chlorides
Radiopharmaceuticals